The following is a non-exhaustive list of ships that were built by Cammell Laird, a shipbuilding and repair company founded in 1828 in Birkenhead, England. The ships are listed in order of their launch, grouped into time periods.

1800s

1900―1924

1925―1949

1950―1974

1975―1999

2000s

References

Sources
 
 
 
 
 
 
 
 
 
 
 
 
 

 
 
 
 
 
 
 
 
 

 
 
 

Cammell Laird